Mesterolone cipionate is a synthetic anabolic–androgenic steroid and an androgen ester – specifically, the C17β cypionate ester of mesterolone – which was never marketed. It is administered via intramuscular injection once every two weeks and acts as a long-acting prodrug of mesterolone. The drug was studied in the treatment of depression in men along with mesterolone in the mid-1970s but was never introduced for medical use.

See also
 List of androgen esters

References

Abandoned drugs
Androgen esters
Androgens and anabolic steroids
Androstanes
Cypionate esters
Ketones
Prodrugs
World Anti-Doping Agency prohibited substances